Henrika (Swedish; variants include Henrika, Henriikka, in Finnish, Henryka, in Polish; Henrica, (in Dutch) is a feminine given name, a female form of Henry. People with the name include:

Henrika
Henrika Juliana von Liewen (1709–1779), Swedish noble, socialite and lady-in-waiting
 (born 1962), Swedish-Finnish writer, translator and journalist
 (born 1972), Swedish-Finnish historian
Henriika
Henriikka Hietaniemi (born 1987), Finnish figure skater
Henryka
Henryka Beyer (1782–1855), German painter active in Poland
Henryka Bochniarz (born 1947), Polish economist and government minister
Henryka Konarkowska (born 1938), Polish–Serbian chess master
Henryka Krzywonos (born 1953), Polish dissident
Henryka Łazowertówna (1909–1942), Polish lyric poet
Henrica
Henrica van Erp (c.1480–1548), Dutch abbess and chronicler
Henrica "Erica" van den Heuvel (born 1966), Dutch badminton player
Leontine Martha Henrica Petronella "Leontien" van Moorsel (born 1970), Dutch cyclist
 (1898–1990), Dutch writer

See also
826 Henrika, a minor planet
Henrica, a genus of fungi
Hendrika, a Dutch version of the name
Henrikas, a Lithuanian masculine given name

Swedish feminine given names

is:Hendrikka
fi:Henriikka
pl:Henryka